Zığra is a village in the Kütahya Province of Turkey. Located just northeast of the city of Kütahya, it has a population of 476. The main road in and out of the village is Alayunt Street, which starts in Kütahya and runs east, through Zığra, to Alayunt. Although a double-track railway runs through the village, Zığra does not have a railway station.

The mayor of Zığra is Kadir Yeşildağ.

References

Villages in Kütahya Province